The 1992 Tampa Bay Buccaneers season was the franchise's 17th season in the National Football League (NFL). It was the first season of Sam Wyche's four-year spell as the Buccaneers' head coach. Wyche said before the season that he believed he could turn Vinny Testaverde into a great player.

Tampa Bay had lop-sided wins in the first two weeks, and looked like they would prove good the coach's words. They started the season 3–1 but then lost ten of the next eleven, starting with a ten-point loss to the Indianapolis Colts. Tampa's closest loss of the year was a four-point Week Thirteen loss to the Los Angeles Rams. Tampa Bay had a first half 27–3 lead, but the Rams scored 28 unanswered points to steal the win. Coincidentally, there would be a playoff game in 2022 where the Buccaneers trailed the Los Angeles Rams, 27-3, and tied the game up with 24 unanswered points, only to lose, 30–27. 

Special teams suffered too, especially from kickers such as Ken Willis making only eight of fourteen field goals.  Reggie Cobb became only the third player in the team's history to rush for 1,000 yards in a season and Santana Dotson made the All-Rookie team. The Bucs finished the season the way they started it, with a win over the Phoenix Cardinals.

Statistics site Football Outsiders calculates that the 1992 Buccaneers had the worst special teams squad of the year, and fourth-worst all time (later having been recalibrated to 7th-worst all-time): "Tampa Bay actually got a solid year from punter Dan Stryzinski, but the return men were poor, the kickers were horrific, and the kick coverage was putrid. Ken Willis and Eddie Murray combined to go 12-for-22 on field goals, and they couldn't stop kicking the ball out of bounds. Willis kicked the first nine games of the season and hit it out of bounds five times. [...] Murray took over for the final seven games and didn't have a single touchback, while hitting it out of bounds three more times. He averaged only 55.5 yards per kickoff. The Bucs weren't the only other team with a single-digit touchback total, but at least the others – New England, Green Bay, and the New York Giants – had the excuse of playing in cold weather."

NFL Draft

The Buccaneers' first-round pick had previously been traded to the Indianapolis Colts in return for quarterback Chris Chandler, and was eventually used to select Quentin Coryatt.

Personnel

Staff

Roster

Regular season

Schedule

Notes:
Division opponents in bold text

Standings

References

Tampa Bay Buccaneers season
Tampa Bay Buccaneers
20th century in Tampa, Florida
Tampa Bay Buccaneers seasons